Halicyclops is a genus of copepods belonging to the family Cyclopidae. There are currently 94 described species found in brackish habitats throughout the world:

Halicyclops aberrans C. E. F. Rocha, 1983
Halicyclops aequoreus (Fischer, 1860)
Halicyclops ambiguus Kiefer, 1967
Halicyclops antiguaensis Herbst, 1983
Halicyclops aquaesurgentis Bozic, 1964
Halicyclops ariakensis Ueda & Nagai, 2009
Halicyclops blachei Lindberg, 1952
Halicyclops bowmani C. E. F. Rocha & Iliffe, 1993
Halicyclops brevispinosus Herbst, 1952
Halicyclops calm Karanovic, 2006
Halicyclops caneki Fiers, 1995
Halicyclops canuensis (Bourne, 1890)
Halicyclops canui Lindberg, 1941
Halicyclops caridophilus Humes, 1947
Halicyclops cenoticola C. E. F. Rocha, Iliffe, Reid & Suárez-Morales, 1998
Halicyclops clarkei Herbst, 1982
Halicyclops continentalis Ueda & Nagai, 2009
Halicyclops coulli Herbst, 1977
Halicyclops crassicornis Herbst, 1955
Halicyclops cryptus Monchenko, 1979
Halicyclops dalmatinus Petkovski, 1955
Halicyclops dedeckeri Brownell, 1983
Halicyclops denticulatus Kiefer, 1960
Halicyclops dussarti C. E. F. Rocha, 1995
Halicyclops eberhardi De Laurentiis, Pesce & Humphreys, 2001
Halicyclops electus Lindberg, 1943
Halicyclops exiguus Kiefer, 1934
Halicyclops fosteri M. S. Wilson, 1958
Halicyclops gauldi Plesa, 1961
Halicyclops gaviriai Suárez-Morales & Fuentes-Reinés, 2014
Halicyclops glaber C. E. F. Rocha, 1983
Halicyclops harpacticoides (Shmankevich, 1875)
Halicyclops herbsti C. E. F. Rocha & Iliffe, 1993
Halicyclops higoensis Itô, 1957
Halicyclops hurlberti C. E. F. Rocha, 1991
Halicyclops incognitus Herbst, 1962
Halicyclops itohi Ueda & Nagai, 2012
Halicyclops japonicus Itô, 1956
Halicyclops kieferi Karanovic, 2004
Halicyclops konkanensis Lindberg, 1949
Halicyclops korodiensis Onabamiro, 1952
Halicyclops laciniatus Herbst, 1987
Halicyclops laminifer Herbst, 1982
Halicyclops lanceolatus Chang & Lee, 2012
Halicyclops latus Shen & Tai, 1964
Halicyclops lindbergi C. E. F. Rocha, 1995
Halicyclops longifurcatus Pesce, De Laurentiis & Humphreys, 1996
Halicyclops lutum Karanovic, 2008
Halicyclops maculatus C. E. F. Rocha & Hakenkamp, 1993
Halicyclops magniceps (Lilljeborg, 1853)
Halicyclops martinezi Totakura & Reddy, 2015
Halicyclops neglectus Kiefer, 1935
Halicyclops oblongus Lindberg, 1951
Halicyclops oraeeburnensis Lindberg, 1957
Halicyclops oryzanus Defaye & Dussart, 1988
Halicyclops ovatus C. E. F. Rocha, 1984
Halicyclops paradenticulatus C. E. F. Rocha, 1984
Halicyclops pescei Karanovic, 2004
Halicyclops pilifer Lindberg, 1949
Halicyclops pilosus C. E. F. Rocha, 1984
Halicyclops pondoensis Wooldridge, 1977
Halicyclops propinquus G. O. Sars, 1905
Halicyclops pumilus Chang & Lee, 2012
Halicyclops pusillus Kiefer, 1954
Halicyclops ramirezi Menu-Marque & Sorarrain, 2007
Halicyclops reidae C. E. F. Rocha & Hakenkamp, 1993
Halicyclops reunionensis Bozic, 1964
Halicyclops reunionis Kiefer, 1960
Halicyclops robustus Lindberg, 1951
Halicyclops rochai De Laurentiis, Pesce & Humphreys, 1999
Halicyclops rotundipes Kiefer, 1935
Halicyclops ryukyuensis Itô, 1962
Halicyclops sarsi Akatova, 1935
Halicyclops septentrionalis Kiefer, 1935
Halicyclops setifer Lindberg, 1950
Halicyclops setiformis Ueda & Nagai, 2012
Halicyclops similis Kiefer, 1935
Halicyclops sinensis Kiefer, 1928
Halicyclops soqotranus Baribwegure & Dumont, 2000
Halicyclops souzacruzae C. E. F. Rocha, 1981
Halicyclops spinifer Kiefer, 1935
Halicyclops stocki Herbst, 1962
Halicyclops tageae Lotufo & C. E. F. Rocha, 1993
Halicyclops tenuispina Sewell, 1924
Halicyclops tetracanthus C. E. F. Rocha, 1995
Halicyclops thermophilus Kiefer, 1929
Halicyclops thysanotus C. B. Wilson, 1935
Halicyclops troglodytes Kiefer, 1954
Halicyclops uncus Ueda & Nagai, 2009
Halicyclops validus Monchenko, 1974
Halicyclops venezuelaensis Lindberg, 1954
Halicyclops verae C. E. F. Rocha, 1984
Halicyclops wilsoni Mahoon & Zia, 1985
Halicyclops ytororoma Lotufo & C. E. F. Rocha, 1993

References

Cyclopoida genera
Cyclopidae